The stool of repentance in Presbyterian polity, mostly in Scotland, was an elevated seat in a church used for the public penance of persons who had offended against the morality of the time, often through fornication and adultery. At the end of the service the offender usually had to stand upon the stool to receive the rebuke of the minister. It was in use until the early 19th century.

Humiliation of sitting on the stool, being punished and publicly repenting sins drove some victims to suicide.  In the case of pregnant women of such parishes who had not conceived with their husbands, they would often elaborately conceal their pregnancy or attempt infanticide rather than face the congregation then Kirk Session.

An alternative to, or commutation of, the stool of repentance was payment of buttock mail.

A harp tune commemorates the tradition.

See also
 Jougs
 Scold's bridle
 Shrew's fiddle

References

Presbyterianism
Torture in Scotland